An advance market commitment (AMC) is a binding contract, typically offered by a government or other financial entity, used to guarantee a viable market for a product once it is successfully developed.  Generally AMCs are used in circumstances where the cost of developing a new product is too high to be worthwhile for the private sector without a guarantee of a certain quantity of purchases in advance.

As such, AMCs have been used in the creation of vaccines or other medicine with high up-front development costs.  As a result of such a commitment, the market for vaccines or drugs for neglected diseases would be comparable in size and certainty to the market for medicines for rich countries. This would encourage biotech and pharmaceutical companies to invest in the development of new vaccines to tackle the world’s most pressing health problems, such as pneumonia, diarrheal disease, HIV/AIDS, and malaria, in the normal course of their business decisions.

An AMC has also been launched for carbon-removal that meets certain technical specifications.

First AMC announced Feb, 2007 
On Feb. 9, 2007, five countries (Canada, Italy, Norway, Russia, the United Kingdom), and the Bill & Melinda Gates Foundation committed US$1.5 billion to launch the first Advance Market Commitment (AMC) to help speed the development and availability of a new vaccine which is expected to save the lives of 7 million children by 2030. The AMC pilot represented the first step in a historic effort to create a market for life-saving vaccines for children in the world’s poorest countries. The new initiative will target pneumococcal disease, a major cause of pneumonia and meningitis that kills 1.6 million people every year.

World Bank President Paul Wolfowitz joined Her Majesty Queen Rania Al-Abdullah of Jordan and high-level representatives of Canada, Italy, Norway, Russia, and the United Kingdom in announcing the pilot AMC, which will test a new model for spurring development of vaccines, specifically those that prevent disease strains prevalent in developing countries.  The pilot will provide 7 to 10 years of funding to support the development of future vaccines against pneumococcal disease and will include provisions to assure the long term sustainable supply and price for the poorest countries.

“With the launch of the first AMC, we can save lives, and we will do it with the investment and expertise of industry,” said Wolfowitz.  “The key aim is to accelerate the production of viable and urgently needed vaccines for the poorest countries where thousands of children die every day from diseases that can be prevented.”

The AMC concept was developed in response to a tragic dilemma, noted Italian Finance Minister Tommaso Padoa-Schioppa, whose government has committed US$635 million to the AMC pilot.

“The AMCs are an absolutely innovative approach which combines market-based financing tools with public intervention.  This innovative instrument opens a new frontier in the financing of the fight against poverty and endemic diseases,” said Padoa-Schioppa, whose ministry has led the drive to adopt the AMC pilot.  “International projects such as this one will make possible to save millions of human lives and demonstrate that development can and must go together with the need to ensure equality and guarantees of a better future for the poorest and the weakest.”

The AMC for pneumococcal disease will offer an improved market for vaccines now in development.  Vaccines are bought only if they meet pre-determined standards of efficacy and safety, and if developing countries ask for them.  After 7 to 10 years, the AMC funding is likely to be depleted.  The AMC will include terms that help assure a sustained and affordable supply in the long term.

Her Majesty Queen Rania, a member of the board of the GAVI Fund, pointed out that in the poorest regions of the world, two to three million children die of preventable diseases every year.

Her Majesty took particular note of the donor nations that are helping to meet the goal of reducing by two-thirds the number of deaths among the world’s most vulnerable children.

“You are giving the gift of health, and, more than that, the gift of hope,” said the Queen. “Thanks to you, more families will have a fighting chance to see their babies survive, to see their boys and girls grow up, their sons and daughters live productive lives.  Thanks to you, entire communities may find the strength to push back against poverty and entire countries may take a step up the ladder of human development.”

Julian Lob-Levyt, executive secretary of the GAVI Alliance, noted that an early version of pneumococcal vaccine is being widely used in developed countries with striking success in preventing disease. However, he added, manufacturers lack the capacity to provide a vaccine well-suited to the developing world on a large scale, and extended protection vaccines are needed to bring pneumococcal disease under control in developing countries.

An independent expert committee, with representation from developing and industrialised countries, recommended that pneumococcal disease be the target of the initial AMC pilot.  Going forward, the AMC will be overseen by an independent assessment committee, which will set and monitor standards for the vaccines.  The World Health Organization will facilitate the establishment of the target product profile and assess the quality, safety and immunogenicity of AMC vaccines. The GAVI Alliance and the World Bank will be responsible for supporting the programmatic and financial functions of the AMC.

“We expect that new pneumococcal vaccines will reach developing countries by 2010, at least 10 years earlier than if the AMC were not available,” Lob-Levyt said.  “Today’s decision will save lives by bolstering efforts to prevent this disease, while paving the way for future AMCs focused on other deadly diseases.”

Origins of the Idea 

The idea of such a contract, previously proposed in academic literature by Professor Michael Kremer and opinion pieces in major newspapers, gained additional momentum in 2005 with the publication of a report,  Making Markets for Vaccines: Ideas to Action by a working group organized by the Center for Global Development.

Target Product Profile
The Target Product Profile (TPP) for the Pneumococcal Advanced Market Commitment (AMC) was developed by the World Health Organization at the request of the AMC Secretariat. On December 11, 2008 the Independent Assessment Committee (IAC) officially endorsed the TPP, making it the definitive set of guidelines for determining the characteristics of AMC-eligible pneumococcal conjugate vaccines. The TPP sets out the standards a vaccine must meet in order to be eligible for sale under the AMC program and the IAC determines whether a candidate vaccine meets the TPP specifications. To meet the TPP, a vaccine must meet or exceed 13 requirements. Specific requirements in the TPP relate to the projected public health impact, vaccine safety, and suitability of the product for use in developing country health systems. More information can be found at: http://vaccineamc.org/progress.html

Carbon removal 
In December 2021, an AMC for carbon-removal was first proposed in a Politico essay by economists Susan Athey, Rachel Glennerster, Christopher Snyder and Nan Ransohoff, the head of Stripe Climate.

In April 2022, Stripe launched Frontier Climate, an AMC, "to buy an initial $925M of permanent carbon removal between 2022 and 2030." Ransohoff, who leads the project, told The Atlantic that the carbon-removal market will probably need to reach $1 trillion per year.

References

HIV/AIDS
Vaccination